Pierre Albarran (18 May 1893 – 24 February 1960) was a French auction and contract bridge player and theorist, and a tennis player. It has been reported that he was born in the West Indies, and also in Chaville, Hauts-de-Seine, France. He died in Paris.

Bridge

At the bridge table Albarran played on the France open team that won the European IBL Championship in 1935 and on the slightly different team that traveled to New York City late that year for a match that may be considered the first world team championship. He subsequently represented France in more than 30 international bridge competitions and won 19 national titles. His contributions to bidding systems include the canapé approach and the convention later called Roman two-suiters. Upon his death Albert H. Morehead observed that Albarran was almost unknown in America "but it is possible that M. Albarran's bidding theories influenced European bridge tactics more than the theories of any other authority in any other country." After France won the inaugural World Team Olympiad three months later, Morehead wrote that an American visitor to a French bridge club would find one big difference in the bridge language, the canapé bidding advocated by Albarran and "adopted by millions of players throughout Europe".

Tennis

On the tennis court, he played for France in two Davis Cup tournaments and won the bronze medal in doubles with Max Décugis at the 1920 Summer Olympics in Antwerp.

Publications
 Bridge, Nouvelle methode de nomination. Les jeux bicolores. Le Canapé, 1946
 Cent donnes extraordinaires: Bridge, 1953, co-author José Le Dentu
 Comment Gagner Au Bridge, 1959, co-author Pierre Jaïs
 L'Encyclopédie du bridge moderne, vol 1. 1957 and vol. 2 1968
 Le Bridge pour Tous, 1949, co-author Robert de Nexon, Publisher: A. Fayard, Paris, LC: 49052576
 Le Nouveau Bridge Pour Tous, 1958, co-authors Robert de Nexon and José Le Dentu
 Notre Methode de Bridge, 1936, co-author Robert de Nexon
 Nouveau Memento de Bridge en 100 Lecons: Encheres Naturelles, 1976, co-author José Le Dentu, Publisher: A. Fayard, Paris, LC: 77576798

References

Further reading
 L'aristocratie du bridge, Pierre Jaïs, José Le Dentu, Alan Truscott, Paris, 1973, (editions Ballard)

External links
 
 Profile at Sports Reference.com
  (including 8 "from old catalog")

1893 births
1960 deaths
Contract bridge writers
French contract bridge players
French male tennis players
Olympic tennis players of France
Olympic bronze medalists for France
Tennis players at the 1920 Summer Olympics
Olympic medalists in tennis
Medalists at the 1920 Summer Olympics
Place of birth missing